This article lists songs about Puerto Rico, set there, or named after a location or feature of the island.

Because Wikipedia is in written rather than audio format, the lyrics and music are usually the most relevant element of each song; so, when adding or editing a song, please list its lyricist(s) and composer(s) if known. When different artists perform what is substantially the same song, please see if there is an existing listing to which other performers can be added, before starting a new listing.

0–9
 "100%" by Big Pun featuring Tony Sunshine
 "787" by Ivy Queen

A
 "A Forgotten Spot (Olvidado)" by Zion & Lennox, Ivy Queen, De La Ghetto, PJ Sin Suela and Lucecita Benitez
 "Alma Boricua" by Zayra Alvarez
 "Almost Like Praying" by Lin-Manuel Miranda and Artists for Puerto Rico
 "Lejos de Ti" by Angel Canales
 America_(West_Side_Story_song) from West Side Story

D
 "Dejame Soñar" by Tony Vega and Tito Puente
 "De La Calle" by Ivy Queen

E
 "En Mi Puertorro" by Andy Montañez and Voltio
 "En mi viejo San Juan" by Noel Estrada

G
 "Grita Conmigo" by Charlie Cruz

H
"Honeymoon in Puerto Rico" by Paul Jabara (1979)
"Hijos del Cañaveral" by Residente

I
 "Isla del Encanto" by Orquesta Broadway

L
 "Lamento Borincano" by Rafael Hernández Marín
 "La Fiesta de Pilito" by El Gran Combo de Puerto Rico
 "La Isla Del Encanto" by Celia Cruz and Compay Segundo 
 "Latin Beat" by Rick Zeno ft. Cindy Laracuente

M
 "Mi Barrio" by Ivy Queen
 "Mi Gente" by Héctor Lavoe
 "Mi Puerto Rico" by Aventura

P
"Perreando" by Don Omar
"Preciosa" by Rafael Hernández Marín
"Preciosa" by Marc Anthony
"Puerto Rico" by Decoupage (1982)
"Puerto Rico" by Eddie Palmieri 
"Puerto Rico" by Frankie Ruiz
"Puerto Rico" by Jerry Rivera 
"Puerto Rico" by KAOS
"Puerto Rico 2006" by Víctor Manuelle and Eddie Palmieri
"Puerto Rico" by Jerry Rivera
"Puerto Rico" by Vaya Con Dios
"Puerto Rican Feeling" by Jose Feliciano
"Puerto Rico" by Frankie Cutlass
"Puerto Rico te la Dedico" by Daddy Yankee, Yaviah and Notty
"Puerto Rico" by Lil Uber
"Puerto Rico Luv" by Kevin Gates

Q
 "Que Bonita Bandera" by Florencio Morales Ramos
 "Que Bonita Bandera" by Two Without Hats

S
 "San Juan Sin Ti" by Luis Enrique
 "San Juan Sin Ti" by Diana Vega
 "Se Necesita Un Milagro" by Domingo Quiñones featuring Ivy Queen

V
 "Vamos a Celebrar" by Ivy Queen

References

Songs about Puerto Rico